Zhytychi  is a Ukrainian professional men's volleyball team, based in Zhytomyr, playing in Ukrainian Super League.

Achievements
 Vyshcha Liha
  (x1) 2019
 Ukrainian Cup
  (x1) 2020

Team roster
Team roster in season 2020-21

Technical staff

References

Ukrainian volleyball clubs
Sport in Zhytomyr